The Central Emergency Operation Center (EMIC) is the emergency operations center of Taiwan which is activated in the event of emergency situation. The center is operated by the National Fire Agency of the Ministry of the Interior.

Levels
CEOC may be designated as a level-2 facility for lesser threats or as a level-1 facility for more severe threats.

Types of disaster
The CEOC currently lists 14 types of disasters, which are typhoons, earthquakes/tsunamis, fires/explosions, floods, drought, oil and gas or power line breaks, extreme cold hazards, landslides, aviation disasters, disasters at sea, land traffic accidents, hazardous material disasters, mining disasters and forest fires.

Backup centers

Northern Backup Center
Completed in February 2006, the center is located at Banqiao District, New Taipei.

Central Backup Center
Completed in December 2012, the center is located at Zhushan Township, Nantou County.

Southern Backup Center
Completed in December 2009, the center is located at Cianjhen District, Kaohsiung.

Official Southern Backup Center
Completed in December 2012, the center is located at Cianjhen District, Kaohsiung.

See also
 National Fire Agency

References

External links

 
 

Emergency services
Disaster preparedness
Government of Taiwan